Heartsease or viola tricolor, is a common European wild flower.

Heartsease may refer to:

 Heartsease, Powys, a small settlement in Powys, Wales
 Heartsease Estate, Norwich, a housing estate located in Norwich, Norfolk
 Heartsease (Hillsborough, North Carolina), a historic home
 Heartsease (film), a 1919 American silent drama film
 HMS Heartsease
 Heart's Ease (album), an album by Shirley Collins